The 30-kilometer road between El Llano and Cartí, Panama provides the only land access to the Kuna Yala area. It was completed in 2009 and paved in 2011. The road is usable all year round. Some inclines are very steep for which a four-wheel drive vehicle is recommended. The road has nonetheless encouraged encroachment onto Kuna land in Kuna Yala. The road runs through a 100,000-hectare forest reserve called Área Silvestre de Narganá, which contains an abandoned Kuna ecolodge and borders the Burbayar Lodge ecolodge. Some hikers hike the length of the road, often staying at Burbayar Lodge en route.

References

Roads in Panama
Darién Province
Guna Yala